Dodecanedioic acid (DDDA) is a dicarboxylic acid with the formula .  A white solid, the compound finds a variety of applications ranging from polymers to materials.  The unbranched compound is the most commonly encountered C12 dicarboxylic acid.

Production 
DDDA has traditionally been produced from butadiene using a multi-step chemical process. Butadiene is first converted to cyclododecatriene through cyclotrimerization.  The triene is then hydrogenated to cyclododecane.  Autoxidation by air in the presence of boric acid gives a mixture of cyclodecanol and the cyclododecanone. In the final step, this mixture oxidized to the diacid using nitric acid.  An alternative route involves ozonolysis of cyclododecene.

Biological process 
Paraffin wax can be converted into DDDA on a laboratory scale with a special strain of Candida tropicalis yeast in a multi-step process. Renewable plant-oil feedstocks sourced from switchgrass could also be used to produce DDDA.

Uses
DDDA is used in antiseptics, top-grade coatings, painting materials, corrosion inhibitors, surfactants, and polymers.  It is one of two precursors to the engineering plastic nylon 612.  The once commercial nylon called Qiana was produced on scale using DDDA.

Medical
In type 2 diabetic patients DDDA demonstrated that IV infusion helps to maintain normal blood sugar and energy levels without increasing the blood glucose load in the process.

References 

Dicarboxylic acids